Dove is the second studio album by American sludge metal band Floor released in 2004 on the No Idea Records label. The songs on the album were recorded in 1994, before the release of their debut album, Floor in 2002 and were only released ten years later after the positive response the band received to their debut album. As with other Floor compositions the album was recorded without a bass guitar and makes extensive use of heavily down tuned guitars. The album was well received. However, AllMusic reviewer Gregory Heaney commented "In contrast to the band's self-titled effort, Dove certainly isn't essential listening, but for the initiated, it definitely makes for an interesting look back at one of underground metal's most woefully underappreciated bands."

Track listing

Personnel
Floor
 Steve Brooks – guitar and vocals
 Anthony Vialon – guitar
 Jeff Sousa – drums and bass guitar

Technical personnel 
 Jeremy du Bois – recording and engineering
 Sean Mahan - cover painting 
 Christina Martinez - photography
 Vardcore - graphics

References

2004 albums
No Idea Records albums
Floor (band) albums